Calhoun County Independent School District is a public school district based in Port Lavaca, Texas (USA).

The district was formed in July 1948 with the consolidation of the Seadrift, Olivia, Six Mile, Long Mott, Magnolia Beach, Kamey, Port O'Connor, and Roemerville districts into the Port Lavaca Independent School District.  As the consolidation resulted in the combined district having boundaries coinciding with those of Calhoun County, the district took its present name in September 1948.

In 2009, the school district was rated "recognized" by the Texas Education Agency.

Schools 
Calhoun High School (Port Lavaca; grades 9–12)
Travis Middle School (Port Lavaca; grades 6–8)
1983-84 National Blue Ribbon School
Seadrift School (Seadrift; grades PK–8)
Port O'Connor Elementary School (Port O'Connor; grades PK–5)
2004 National Blue Ribbon School
Jackson-Roosevelt Elementary School (Port Lavaca; grades PK–5)
Harrison-Jefferson-Madison Elementary School (Port Lavaca; grades PK–5)
Hope Alternative High School (Port Lavaca; grades 9–12)

Former Schools
Point Comfort Elementary School (Point Comfort; grades K–5)
2006 National Blue Ribbon School

References

External links 

School districts in Calhoun County, Texas
School districts established in 1948
1948 establishments in Texas